George J. Kupka (July 3, 1912 – December 30, 1989) was an American politician in the state of Washington. He served in the Washington House of Representatives and Washington State Senate.
Prior to his State service, he served in the Navy during WWII and also was a deputy sheriff in the Pierce County's Criminal division of the Pierce County Sheriff's Office.

References

1989 deaths
1912 births
Democratic Party Washington (state) state senators
Democratic Party members of the Washington House of Representatives
20th-century American politicians